Gennady Andreyevich Sapunov (born 5 December 1938) was a Greco-Roman wrestler from Russia. He competed in the 1968 Olympics and won two gold and a silver medal at the World Wrestling Championships. From 1979 to 1990 he was the trainer for the Soviet Greco-Roman wrestling team.

References

External links

1938 births
Living people
Olympic wrestlers of the Soviet Union
Wrestlers at the 1968 Summer Olympics
Soviet male sport wrestlers
World Wrestling Championships medalists